Matthew Soukup (born 31 August 1997) is a Canadian ski jumper. Soukup started skiing at the age of three, and later on picked up the sport of ski jumping. His surname is pronounced as "soh-koop" (shortly).

Career
Soukup has competed at two World Championships. Soukup trains in Slovenia, as the jumps at the Canada Olympic Park in Calgary were shut down.

2022 Winter Olympic Games
In January 2022, Soukup was named to Canada's 2022 Olympic team. 

On February 7, Soukup won the bronze medal as part of Canada's entry into the mixed team competition. This was Canada's first ever Olympic medal in the sport of ski jumping.

References

External links
 

1997 births
Living people
Sportspeople from Calgary
Canadian male ski jumpers
Ski jumpers at the 2022 Winter Olympics
Olympic bronze medalists for Canada
Olympic ski jumpers of Canada
Medalists at the 2022 Winter Olympics
Olympic medalists in ski jumping
Canadian expatriates in Slovenia